Dictyna szaboi is spider species found in Hungary, Czech Republic, Slovakia and Russia.

See also 
 List of Dictynidae species

References

External links 

Dictynidae
Spiders of Europe
Spiders of Russia
Spiders described in 1891